Peter Hewitt may refer to:

Peter Cooper Hewitt (1861–1921), American engineer
Peter Hewitt (director) (born 1962), English film director
Peter Hewitt (businessman) (born 1953), English business and civic figure

See also
Peter Howitt (disambiguation)